Płocice  is a village in the administrative district of Gmina Lipusz, within Kościerzyna County, Pomeranian Voivodeship, in northern Poland.

For details of the history of the region, see History of Pomerania.

The village has a population of 71.

References

Villages in Kościerzyna County